The 1963 All-Ireland Minor Hurling Championship was the 33rd staging of the All-Ireland Minor Hurling Championship since its establishment by the Gaelic Athletic Association in 1928.

Kilkenny entered the championship as the defending champions in search of a fourth successive title, however, they were beaten by Wexford in the Leinster final.

On 1 September 1963 Wexford won the championship following a 6-12 to 5-9 defeat of Limerick in the All-Ireland final. This was their first All-Ireland title.

Results

Connacht Minor Hurling Championship

Semi-final

Final

Leinster Minor Hurling Championship

First round

Second round

Quarter-finals

Semi-finals

Final

Munster Minor Hurling Championship

Quarter-finals

Semi-finals

Final

Ulster Minor Hurling Championship

Semi-finals

Final

All-Ireland Minor Hurling Championship

Semi-finals

Final

Statistics

Miscellaneous
 The All-Ireland semi-final between Limerick and Roscommon was the first ever championship meeting between the two teams. It remains their only meeting in this grade. The 54-point winning margin for Limerick is a record for an All-Ireland semi-final.

External links
 All-Ireland Minor Hurling Championship: Roll Of Honour

Minor
All-Ireland Minor Hurling Championship